Barlog is a surname. Notable people with the surname include:

 Boleslaw Barlog (1906–1999), German stage, film, and opera director
 Cory Barlog (born 1975), American video game designer

See also
 Barlow (surname)

Polish-language surnames